The following organizations assist people with or do research into cystic fibrosis, a hereditary disease affecting the lungs and digestive system, causing progressive disability and often early death.

Australia
Cystic Fibrosis Australia (CFA), an Australian national organization aimed at raising awareness and education of cystic fibrosis through advocacy and research
Cystic Fibrosis Community Care (CF Community Care), the largest Australian state-based organization dedicated to raising awareness of CF, providing support services and advocacy to people with CF, and funding research into CF. CF Community Care represents over 1,700 people living with CF in New South Wales and Victoria.
Cystic Fibrosis Western Australia (CFWA), a Western Australian based organisation that funds critical research and essential support services to improve the lives of children and adults affected by cystic fibrosis.

Europe
Association Grégory Lemarchal, a French organization dedicated to information outreach and research for cystic fibrosis, named after the French singer and Star Academy winner Grégory Lemarchal
Build4Life, a voluntary Irish Cystic Fibrosis charity that raises funds to develop CF facilities.
Cystic Fibrosis Ireland (CFI), a voluntary Irish organization set up in 1963 by parents, to aid patients with CF by improving facilities and treatments.
Child Health International (CHI), a UK-based organization providing help especially in Eastern Europe, concentrating on low cost, sustainable solutions based on teamwork and family involvement.
Chloe Cotton Trust Fund, a UK based foundation to help support families and their children with cystic fibrosis.
 Cystic Fibrosis Foundation Slovenia, a Slovenian association providing information and care for CF patients and their families
 Nederlands Cystic Fibrosis Stichting, a Dutch organization providing research, information and care for people and family with cystic fibrosis
Cystic Fibrosis Trust, a UK charity providing research, information and care for people with cystic fibrosis
DCFH - Deutsche CF-Hilfe - Unterstützung für Menschen mit Mukoviszidose e.V., a German-based patient organisation to support people with cystic fibrosis
European Cystic Fibrosis Society (ECFS), a Denmark-based organization of clinicians and scientists actively engaged in CF research, care and collaboration
Mukolife.com, a German social network for the CF community where members can post blogs, ask questions, chat, maintain a profile, contact others and search members. It is created by the CF community for the CF community.
Cisztás Fibrózis Betegek Egyesülete (CFBE), Association of cystic fibrosis patients organisation to support people and family with cystic fibrosis.

North America
Attain Health Foundation, Attain Health helps individuals living with cystic fibrosis optimize their health through partnership and peer support.
Blooming Rose Foundation, a US-based organization that offers support and social services to families with a new diagnosis of CF.
Boomer Esiason Foundation, a US-based organization supporting research aimed at finding a cure for cystic fibrosis as well providing education and raising quality of life for people with cystic fibrosis, named after Boomer Esiason, a former NFL quarterback, whose son Gunnar has cystic fibrosis.
Breathe 4 Tomorrow Foundation (B4TF), a US-based organization focused on making life easier one breath at a time for people with CF through assistive services, awareness and research.
Breathe Bravely, a US-based organization committed to connecting and serving the CF community through the art of singing, offering free vocal lessons and featuring a CF-based virtual choir. 
Cystic Fibrosis Continuity of Care, LLC, a US-based Specialty Nurse Consulting firm that provides both clinical and business process improvement services surrounding the coordination of care for patients living with CF.
Cystic-L, a Listserv and a website dedicated to the exchange of information and support specific to cystic fibrosis.  Operating since 1994, Cystic-L serves people with CF and those who share their lives: medical professionals, scientists, researchers, parents, grandparents, spouses, siblings, friends and significant others.
Cystic Fibrosis Canada (CCFF), a Canada-wide health charity, which funds cystic fibrosis research and care.
Cystic Fibrosis Foundation (CFF), a US non-profit providing the means to cure and control cystic fibrosis.
Cystic Fibrosis Lifestyle Foundation (CFLF), seeks to create therapies that engage adolescents and young adults with cystic fibrosis as active agents in their healthcare physically, psychologically and spiritually, thereby enabling attitudes and lifestyles that create stronger and longer lives for themselves. Founded by Brian Callanan.
Cystic Fibrosis-Reaching Out Foundation, a US-based network of information and support for people with CF and their families.
CysticLife.org (CL), A positive social network for the CF community where members can post blogs, ask questions, maintain a profile, contact others and search members by age, location, gender and relation to CF.
Elizabeth Nash Foundation, a US-based organization focused on research, education and patient support, named after scientist Elizabeth Nash.
Emily's Entourage, a nonprofit organization that raises money and awareness to help find a cure for rare ("nonsense") mutations of cystic fibrosis (CF), named after Emily Kramer-Golinkoff.
Help One Love One, a US-based non-profit organization assisting adults with CF with nutritional support.
Liv for a Cure, a US-based foundation dedicated to raising money for fight against CF.
Liam Foundation, a non-profit organization dedicated to raising money and enhancing the lives of those with Cystic Fibrosis.
Lungs for Life Foundation, a US-based organization focused on improving quality of life for people with CF through assistive services, education and research.
Mauli Ola Foundation, based out of Hawaii, co-chaired by pro surfer Kala Alexander, that takes kids (and adults) with CF surfing (often with world champion surfers such as Kelly Slater and Sunny Garcia) introducing them to the natural therapeutic effects of the ocean. The foundation strives to raise the awareness of CF.
National Cystic Fibrosis Awareness Committee (NCFAC), a US-based group focused on increased public CF awareness through an annual national Cystic Fibrosis Awareness observance.
New Jersey State Organization Of Cystic Fibrosis (NJSOCF) an organization in New Jersey whose mission is to ease the financial burdens placed on the cystic fibrosis community and offer support.
Rock CF Foundation, a US-based non profit organization that uses the arts, entertainment, fashion and fitness to increase awareness and raise funds for cystic fibrosis. Founded by Emily Schaller.
Take A Breather Foundation, grants wishes for children living with CFin the Philadelphia area. Founded in 2012.
Piper's Angels Foundation (PAF), its mission is to support and improve the lives of people in the CF community by raising awareness through education, offering life expanding activities, providing urgent financial support and funding essential research.

International
Cystic Fibrosis Worldwide (CFW), an international network concentrated on increasing quality of life and life expectancy for people with cystic fibrosis
CysticFibrosis.com, an internet information hub with support forums
CysticLife.org (CL), a positive social network for the CF community where members can post blogs, ask questions, maintain a profile, contact others and search members by age, location, sex and relation to CF.
Sharktank.org, an internet group composed of mostly patients and parents. Research and education are the main focus with the objective that knowledge of the disease will allow better decision making and improve overall health.

References 

Cystic fibrosis organizations
Cystic fibrosis